The 2008 Samsung Super League was the 2008 edition of the Samsung Super League, the premier international team Grand Prix show jumping competition run by the FEI and sponsored by Samsung Electronics. It was held at eight European venues from May 9 to September 21, 2008. Germany won the series for the third consecutive year, while Ludger Beerbaum of Germany won the title of top rider. Sweden was relegated to the 2009 FEI Nations Cup after finishing last in the eight team series.

2008 show schedule

Standings

Overall 

 was relegated to the 2009 FEI Nations Cup Promotional League. Before the beginning of the 2009 season of the Meydan FEI Nations Cup (the follower of the Samsung Super League), the number of participating nations teams in the Meydan FEI Nations Cup has been increased up to ten. Thus, after the descent of Sweden, three nations starting positions are reassigned. This was done by the placement of best placed show jumpers from every nation in the world rankings. The emerging nations to the 2009 Meydan FEI Nations Cup were Sweden, France and Canada. The national equestrian federation of Canada refrained, so Italy moved into the Meydan FEI Nations Cup for the 2009 season.

Top rider

External links 
Official website

2008 in show jumping
Samsung Super League